Kannu may refer to:

Kannu, Tartu County, a village in Estonia
Kannu, Võru County, a village in Estonia
Kannu (learning management system), for music, arts and alternative education.